The 1922 Washington Sun Dodgers football team was an American football team that represented the University of Washington during the 1922 college football season. In its second season under head coach Enoch Bagshaw, the team compiled a 6–1–1 record, finished in third place in the Pacific Coast Conference, and outscored its opponents by a combined total of 129 to 72. For the second consecutive season, Ray Eckmann was the team captain.

1922 marked the university's adoption of the Huskies nickname.

Schedule

References

Washington
Washington Huskies football seasons
Washington Sun Dodgers football